Karim Amer (born November 10, 1983) is an Egyptian-American film producer and director. He worked on The Square (2013) and The Great Hack (2019); the former was the first Egyptian film to earn an Academy Award nomination and went on to win three Emmy Awards, while the latter got nominated for an Emmy and a BAFTA Award. In 2020, he produced and directed The Vow, an HBO documentary series about the self-improvement group, NXIVM.

Life and work 
Amer and filmmaking partner Jehane Noujaim met whilst she was filming The Square, which he went on to co-produce with her. That film is about the Egyptian Crisis up until 2013, starting with the Egyptian revolution of 2011 at Tahrir Square. The film went on to win the Audience Award at the Sundance Film Festival and the Toronto Film Festival. It ultimately won three Emmy Awards and was the first Egyptian film to get nominated for an Academy Award.

Initially, Amer and Noujaim meant out to make a documentary revolving around the Sony Pictures hack, however the film evolved and shifted course as they started looking at how people's minds have been hacked and changed, which led to The Great Hack about the Facebook-Cambridge Analytica data scandal. The film premiered at Sundance Film Festival and went on to get nominated at the BAFTA and Emmy Awards, and won an award at the Cinema Eye Honors. Additionally, Amer developed Persuasion Machines, a project exploring virtual reality at the Sundance Film Festival

In 2017, Amer teamed up with Angelina Jolie to produce Academy Award-nominated film The Breadwinner. In 2019, Amer also produced the Golden Globe-winning series Ramy on Hulu. The series went on to gain critical acclaim and was described as "an insightful and hilarious glimpse into the life of a Muslim American family." In the same year, Amer was an executive producer on the 2019 HBO documentary film Revolution Rent, which follows Andy Señor Jr. to Cuba as he stages a production of Jonathan Larson’s Rent, which marked the first American company of a Broadway musical there in more than half a century.

Amer directed the first season of The Vow, a documentary series revolving around NXIVM and its leader Keith Raniere for HBO. The Washington Post, Entertainment Weekly, and The Los Angeles Times listed The Vow as one of the best series of 2020.

In 2021, Amer produced the narrative film You Resemble Me, which premiered at the Venice Film Festival. The film was written and directed by his sister, Dina Amer. It won the Audience Award at the Red Sea International Film Festival. It also won an unprecedented four awards at REC Tarragona, including the CineClub Jury Prize, the Young Jury Prize and the Audience Award.

In 2022, Amer directed alongside Fisher Stevens, The Lincoln Project focusing on the scandal-ridden organization of the same name for Showtime.

Amer and Noujaim are developing a TV series "aimed at challenging perceptions of the Arab world as portrayed by such shows as Homeland and Tyrant". In addition to his 2022 Amazon Prime Video documentary Flight/Risk, Amer is set to produce a limited series also about Boeing’s controversial 737 Max planes. The untitled project, which is now in early development at Amazon Studios, hails from Oscar-winning screenwriter Chris Terrio and is expected to star Jeremy Strong, who will headline and executive produce as well.

Filmography

Awards and nominations

References

External links

American documentary filmmakers
American film directors
English-language film directors
American people of Egyptian descent
People from Alexandria
Living people
1983 births